The Escorial Beatus (Escorial, Biblioteca Monasterio, Cod. & II. 5) is a 10th-century illuminated manuscript of the Commentary on the Apocalypse by Beatus of Liébana. The illuminations of the manuscript show similarities in style to those produced by Florentius, the artist responsible for a copy of the Moralia in Job of Pope Gregory I (Madrid, Biblioteca Nacional, Cod. 80).  The manuscript was probably created at the monastery at San Millán de la Cogolla. There are 151 extant folios which measure 395mm by 225mm. The manuscript is illustrated with 52 surviving miniatures.

References

Walther, Ingo F. and Norbert Wolf. Codices Illustres: The world's most famous illuminated manuscripts, 400 to 1600. Köln, TASCHEN, 2005.

External links
The Art of medieval Spain, A.D. 500-1200, an exhibition catalog from The Metropolitan Museum of Art Libraries (fully available online as PDF), which contains material on Escorial Beatus (no. 81)

Illuminated beatus manuscripts
Mozarabic art and architecture
10th-century illuminated manuscripts
Spanish manuscripts